Sandy Cove is a town located on the Eastport Peninsula in Newfoundland and Labrador, Canada. It is located on Newman Sound, which is part of Bonavista Bay. It had a population of 120 in the 2021 census.

Demographics 

See also 
 List of communities in Newfoundland and Labrador

References

External links 

Populated coastal places in Canada
Towns in Newfoundland and Labrador